Naromurar is a Village in Warisaliganj Tehsil, located  from National Highway 31 and  from State Highway 59, making it the only village of the area well connected to both Nawada and Nalanda districts of Bihar. 
Literally the word Nar means water and Murar means Lord Krishna who appeared as the 8th avatara of Lord Vishnu in Dvapara Yuga as mentioned in Garuda Purana,
that is the word Naromurar means the house of lord Vishnu -Kshirsagar.
Naromurar is a village of great traditions. It is one of the ancient villages of India having a four hundred year older Thakur Wadi dedicated to Maryada Purushottam Ram and Lord Shiva. 
Along with the Rajkiyakrit Madhya Vidyalay having established in 1920 AD, 27 years before the freedom of India, a Janta Pustakalay the Public Library is also started in the year of 1956 AD which was inaugurated by the Education Minister of Bihar during the time of Krishna Singh.

History

Black Death 
 India was depopulated, Tartary, Mesopotamia, Syria, Armenia were covered with dead bodies - as mentioned by a German physician Justus Hecker in his book "Epidemics of the middle Ages" page no 21.
The Black death was one of the most devastating Pandemics in human history. The Black death is thought to have originated from the Tartary plains of Central Asia,  where it then travelled along the Silk Road and sea trade roots with Mongol armies and traders spreading throughout China, India reaching the seaports of Europe by 1346 AD. The black death is estimated to have killed 2.5 crores Chinese and other Asians before it entered Europe. 
It is estimated to have killed 30 to 60% of Europe's total population.
All in one the plague reduced the world population from an estimated 45 crores down to 35 crores in the 14th century.
However the analysis of DNA from victims published in 2010 indicates that the pathogen responsible was the Yersinia bactetium, probably causing several forms of plague.

Migration From Pandarak 

In the 1340s while the Plague was spreading towards the eastern part of India, It reached the pandarak a village now in patna district Bihar. The villagers could do nothing but to see others die and wait for their turn.
Most of the villagers were dying due to the plague attack, people used to say - "Bhagwan nikauni kar rahe hai"
In Magadhi speaking people nikauni word is used for cultivation, the process of weeding the unwanted herbages from crops is known as Nikauni. Some of them who survived migrated to Apsarh or Aanti village now in Nawada district Bihar, later a group of people from Apsarh migrated to Kochgaon village and some of them to Naromurar in order to protect their lives.
It is believed that in the year of 1352 AD two brothers namely Naro Singh and Murar Singh along with their families were the first immigrants to come that place which later flourished and developed and came to be known as Naromurar after their names.

History of Temples 
Literally the word Nar means water and Murar means lord Krishna who appeared as the 8th avatara of lord Vishnu in Dvapara Yuga as mentioned in Garuda purana, that is the word Naromurar means the house of lord Vishnu - Kshirsagar.
Naromurar is a village with the diversities of Hindu sub castes, belief and worship is common amongst the villagers with a sincere love for one another.
To express their strong devotion and love to the God, villagers have built a number of temples all around the village having the sculptures of different Hindu Deities. Devisthan in the south, Thakursthan in the north, Durgasthan in the east, Shivamandir in the west, Shivalaya at the centre along with Thakurwadi, Vishnu temple and Mathuradham Suryamandir at the outskirts of the village, Temples all around the village making it looks like a mini Bhubaneswar

Devi Sthan 

In the year of 1352 AD, when the village was founded by Naro Singh and Murar Singh, a temple "Devi Sthan" had also been built inside the village to practice their religious belief and faith towards the God.
Devi Sthan is the oldest known temple of Naromurar having Devi pratima in the center surrounded with several other sculptures of Hindu God and Goddess inside the temple.
It is one of the most sacred place not only for the villagers but also of the area, People from the nearby areas also use to visit there for the treatment of diseases like "Eczema". Due to its poor condition the temple was rebuilt in 2002AD by Ramsagar Prasad Sinha, former General Manager ONGC Mumbai.
There are a group of Pandits in the village for the medication of such diseases in a traditional aryurvedic fashion.

Thakur Sthan 

Thakursthan is the second oldest temple dedicated to Lord Shiva, located in north east direction of the village. A temple dedicated to Goddess Parvathi is also built in the premises later. 
Beauty of Thakur Sthan seeks attention of all the villagers on the festival of Maha Shivaratri.

Thakur Wadi 

Nearly four hundred years ago a Thakurwadi had been built by the villagers in the south west outskirts of the village. It is well surrounded by gardens of Mango, Gooseberry, Guava, Banana, Papaya and several other trees from all the side.
The temple is dedicated to Hindu God Rama along with laxmana and Goddess Sita.
A group of saints with the chief priest of the temple known as Mahant, are employed there to practice their religious interest.
A plot of 11 Bigha is also allocated to the incumbent Mahant for the welfare of saints and Thakurwadi.
According to the tradition of the Thakurwadi, after declaring a Saint as the new Mahant he has to adopt a new title Das.

Durga Sthan
Adi Shakti Ma Durga temple is located in the kachahari premises of the village. There is a dedicated cultural organization Adarsh Natyakala Parishad to organize the grand Durga Pooja. Along with worshipping the nine forms of Devi, a series of cultural activities are also performed throughout the Navaratra that fills the entire village with full of energy and happiness. A series of Natyakala organized by the Adarsh natyakala Parishad during the five nights starting from the Jagarana to day after Vijayadashmi is unique throughout the Warisaliganj and nearby villages.

Shiv Parvati Hanuman Mandir

Three temples to worship Lord Shiva, Goddess Parvathi and Lord Hanuman is situated in the Kachahari premises of the village. There is one attached community hall as well to organize cultural programs during the sacred Hindu festival of Ramnavami and Holi.

Mathuradham Suryamandir

In the year of 2002 AD, A Sun temple is built at the outskirts of the village by Shree Shyamdev Singh. Villagers named it Mathuradham Suryamandir to respect the late Mathura Singh, the father of Shyamdev Singh. A Shyamkund is also built in the premises for the villagers to celebrate the sacred Hindu festival of Chhath Pooja. 
In 2012 AD, a Shiva temple is also built in the premises by Shree Chandeshwar Singh.

Shiv Parvati Laxmi Mandir
There are three temples in the premises dedicated to Lord Shiva, Goddess Parvathi and Goddess Laxmi. Shiva Mandir built in the year of 2006 AD by Shree Ajay Singh followed by Parvati Mandir in 2014 AD by Shrimati Gayatri Devi and laxmi Mandir in the year of 2015 AD by Pravin Singh. The temple seeks attention of the villagers on the occasion of laxmi Pooja. Naromurar village has a dedicated cultural organization Tarun laxmi Pooja Samiti to organize the grand laxmi Pooja.

Ancient Naromurar Kachahari 

Before the advent of Independence in 1947 AD, Bihar was one of the provinces under the rule of British Raj.
In 1936 Bihar and Orissa Province was declared as separate provinces of Bihar and Orissa under the Government of India Act 1935 passed by the Parliament of United Kingdom, before the year of 1912 Bihar and Orissa province was the part of Bengal Presidency.
For administrative purposes the provinces were divided into several parts having a Zamindar as the head of each, over time they took princely and royal titles such as Maharaja, Nawab, Mirza and many others.

Naromurar was one of the 2046 villages of South Bihar under the jurisdiction of Tekari Raj.
Earlier Zamindars in Bengal, Bihar and Odisha had been functionaries who held the right to collect revenue on behalf of the Mughal emperors. By the permanent settlement act of 1793, the zamindars power of keeping the armed forces were taken back and they remained just the tax collectors of the land. The power of zamindars were considerably weakened as they were not allowed to hold any court as it was brought under the supervision of collector appointed by the company. They did not want to take direct control of local administration in villages because of several reasons, they did not want to annoy those people who had traditionally enjoyed power and prestige in the village.
The court commonly consists of four people having their designations as -

In the centre of the village there used to be a big Ficus religiosa tree, under its shade a delegation having the associates of zamindar used to collect the revenues from the villagers during the zamindari period. The place is still known as kachahari (court), after the independence several temples has been built inside the kachahari campus but that peepal tree can still be found reminding us about the zamindari era.
Along with Naromurar there were nine more villages under the jurisdiction of this Kachahari and the villagers from all those villages had to report there in order to pay their taxes.
Villages under the jurisdiction of Naromurar Kachahari -

Administration 

Naromurar is one of the 75 villages under the administrative region of warisaliganj block in Nawada district.
Giriraj Singh is the Incumbent Member of Parliament from Nawada and Aruna Devi is the Member of legislative Assembly from Warisaliganj.

Gram Panchayat
Warisaliganj is one of the 14 Panchayat Samitis under Nawada Jila Parishad. Warisaliganj Panchayat Samiti is further subdivided into sixteen Gram panchayats for better administration. Naromurar comes in the administrative division of kutri Gram Panchayat under Warisaliganj Panchayat Samiti.

Naromurar Wards 
Naromurar Village is further subdivided into four wards. Current Wards are -
Satrughan Kumar 
Ramashish Mochi
Bina Devi
Buni Devi

Naromurar Sevak Sangh 
Naromurar Sevak Sangh is a Non Governmental, Non Profit Organization founded by a group of New Generation villagers . Currently having Naromurar village its jurisdiction, Motive of the Naromurar Sevak Sangh is to uplift the village by using all the skills of privileged villagers. The Organization co founders met on the auspicious day of Vijayadashmi, 20 Oct 2015,  in the premises of Rajkiyakrit Madhya Vidyalay - Naromurar for the first time with a common motive to serve the village selflessly by all means.

Demography

Population and Sex Ratio 
Naromurar is a large village located in Warisaliganj of Nawada district, Bihar with total 290 families residing. The Naromurar village has population of 2035 of which 1047 are males while 988 are females as per Population Census 2011.
In Naromurar village population of children with age 0-6 is 337 which makes up 16.56% of total population of village. Average Sex Ratio of Naromurar village is 944 which is higher than Bihar state average of 918. Child Sex Ratio for the Naromurar as per census is 764, lower than Bihar average of 935.

Literacy Rate
Naromurar village has higher literacy rate compared to Bihar. In 2011, literacy rate of Naromurar village was 73.20% compared to 61.80% of Bihar. In Naromurar Male literacy stands at 84.81% while female literacy rate was 61.40%.
As per constitution of India and Panchyati Raaj Act, Naromurar village is administrated by Sarpanch (Head of Village) who is elected representative of village.

Work Profile 
In Naromurar village out of total population, 685 were engaged in work activities. 45.55% of workers describe their work as Main Work (Employment or Earning more than 6 Months) while 54.45% were involved in Marginal activity providing livelihood for less than 6 months. Of 685 workers engaged in Main Work, 210 were cultivators (owner or co-owner) while 49 were Agricultural labourer.
Primary occupation of the villagers are Cultivation and Animal husbandry, primary crops grown are - Rice and Wheat. A Canal flows through the village making the soils more fertile for farming. People are fond of Mangoes and for their interest they have planted several mangoes garden surrounding the village as well. 
The villagers are also serving in Armed Forces of India, Public sector undertakings, Government Universities and Multi National Corporations as Armed Forces, Managers, Professors and Engineers.  Some villagers are also affiliated to noted educational institutes of India like -National Institutes of Technology, Vellore Institute of Technology, Kalinga Institute of Industrial Technology, Delhi University, Punjab University, Annamalai University, Magadh University and many more.

Education

Rajkiykrit Madhya Vidyalay Naromurar 
School Code : 10361403401

History

The school was established in 1920 by the Department of Education.

School Background
The school consists of Grades from one to Eight. The school is co-educational and it does not have an attached pre-primary section. The school is non-residential in nature and is not using school building as a shift-school. Hindi is the medium of instructions in this school. In this school academic session starts in April.

Facilities
The school has Government building. It has got 8 classrooms for instructional purposes. The source of Drinking Water in the school is hand pump and it is functional. The school has 1 boys toilet and it is functional. and 1 girls toilet and it is functional. The school has a library and has 900 books in its library. Medical check-up is also arranged for its students once in a year. The school does not need ramp for disabled children to access classrooms. The school is providing mid-day meal which is prepared in the school premises.

Current Teachers list
Currently school does not have a regular Head Master. The school has 5 regular teachers in position. The school has 2 female teachers. It has no Contract Teacher. The school does not have non-teaching staff. Precisely, 5 teachers of school are having graduate and above degrees. On the other hand, all teachers have professional certification(s)/degree(s). The Pupil-Teacher Ratio (PTR) of the school is 71:1 and the Student-Classroom Ratio (SCR), 44:1.

Sevak Sangh Gurukul 
On 21 November 2015,
Naromurar Sevak Sangh started its second unit Sevak Sangh Gurukul.

Motive of Sevak Sangh Gurukul
 To enable underprivileged potential children to access the quality of education.
 To provide education that helps a student get a quality of life and at the same time teaches them their social responsibilities.
 To build the nation and make this world a better place to live.

How does it work
Gurukul admission fee is 20 Rupees a month for a student. Currently Gurukul is open for all the students from Zero to 10th standard. Sevaak Sangh Pustakalay provide books to underprivileged children of Gurukul for an academic year with no cost. A Gurukul Investors Network support Gurukul financially, Members and their contribution changes after every four months time period. Depending on their skills and academic standard, Currently students are divided into four sections. Section Ganesha - Up to standard 2nd, Section Vidyapati - Std 3rd, 4th, Section Aryabhata - Std 5th, 6th, Section Chanakya - Std 7th, 8th, 9th and 10th. Each section is taken care by a dedicated regular teacher and one assistant teacher from the Gurukul Teachers Network. Special classes are arranged for the 9th and 10th standard students by selected quality teachers from the Gurukul Teachers Network. In future we are also planning to start one Eklavya Section for potential students aspiring to join Navodaya.

Janta Pustakalay Naromurar 
A public library named Janta Pustakalay is started in the year of 1956 AD which was inaugurated by the Education Minister of Bihar during the time of Krishna Singh.
Janta Pustakaly is restarted on auspicious day of Deepawali by Naromurar Sevak Sangh. Library remains open throughout the day for all the villagers. Books are available for all the age group people starting from the Rigveda to Manohar Pothi and from Pratiyogita Darpan to Suman Saurabh.

Cultural Organizations

Adarsh Natyakala Parishad

It is founded by Ashok Singh, Anant Singh and Nivas Singh to organize the Durga Pooja in the village. A series of Natyakala organized by the Adarsh natyakala Parishad during the five nights starting from the Jagarana to day after Vijayadashmi is unique throughout the Warisaliganj and nearby villages. A huge number of people from across the nearby area visit the village during the festival. 
Sanjay Singh, Ranjeet Singh, Rampravesh Singh, Doman Singh and many more are active members along with the Ashok Singh and Anant Singh.

Tarun Laxmi Pooja Samiti
It was founded in the year of 2011 AD by Kaushlendra Singh, Naveen Kumar, Sinod Singh, Umesh Singh and Praveen Singh. Tarun laxmi Pooja Samiti organize laxmi Pooja in the village every year, a series of cultural programs and Natyakala remains the center of the beauty for the villagers throughout the laxmi Pooja. People from the nearby villages also make their attendance to celebrate the festival.

Adarsh Kishan Club

It was founded by Vijay Singh, Ram nandan Singh and Bal mukund Singh. It is located nearby thakur sthan.

Facilities

Naromurar Post office 
A Post office is established in the village by the Government to provide the postal services throughout the nearby area. Jurisdiction - Kutri Gram PanchayatAddress : Naromurar Post Office, Warisaliganj, Nawada, Bihar, India, PIN - 805130

Naromurar Pax 
Pax of the Kutri Gram Panchayat is located in Naromurar.  Krishnandan Singh is the Current Chief of Naromurar Pax.  All the Central Government Services under Public Distribution System is regularly implemented by the Pax to the beneficiaries throughout the Gram Panchayat.

Primary Health Centre Naromurar 

To provide the Primary health care services to the villagers there is a Primary Health Centre in the village.

Anganwadi Centre Naromurar
There is an Anganwadi Centre in the village to provide primary health care to the mothers and children below age 6.

Transportation

Rail Network
 Warisaliganj (Patna Railway Station → Gaya Railway Station → Warisaliganj or Patna → Kiul railway station → Warisaliganj) is the nearest railway station. Private cabs are easily available from Warisaliganj to Naromurar.
From Pawapuri mod take any public transport or private cab to reach Kharat Mod via NH 31, From Kharat mod take any private cab to Naromurar via Basochak.

Road Network
 From Meethapur Bus Stand or Gandhi Maidan Bus Stand, Patna to Warisaliganj
 From Meethapur Bus Stand or Gandhi Maidan Bus Stand, Patna to Nawada, from Nawada to Warisaliganj either by train or by bus
 From Meethapur Bus Stand or Gandhi Maidan Bus Stand, Patna to Bihar Sharif, from Bihar Sharif to Kharat mod via NH 31

Photo gallery

See also

 Kakolat Falls
 Nalanda
 Government of Bihar
 Panchayati raj (India)
 Magadha
 Rajgir hills
 Barabar Caves
 Nawada
 Warisaliganj

References 

Villages in Nawada district